Daniel David Draper Jr. (April 12, 1940 – November 18, 2004) was an American attorney and politician from the U.S. state of Oklahoma. He served as a member of the Oklahoma House of Representatives from 1971 until 1983, and served as the 32nd Speaker of the Oklahoma House of Representatives, beginning in 1979 until his conviction of a felony in the 1980s.

Background
Born in Tahlequah, Oklahoma, he received his bachelor's degree in accounting from Oklahoma State University. He then went to University of Oklahoma College of Law and later received his law degree from Washington University School of Law. He was the Stillwater, Oklahoma, city attorney and taught business law at Oklahoma State University. He died in Stillwater, Oklahoma.

Political career
Draper was first elected to the Oklahoma House of Representatives in 1971. In 1978, Draper was presiding in the chair during the final day of session when there was a dispute over adjournment.

He was first elected speaker in 1979. The speaker's race was competitive, with five vying for the seat, and he won the race with the support of a group of conservative, rural Democrats led by Vernon Dunn and a group of progressive Democrats led by Cleta Deatherage and Jim Fried.

Draper was convicted of a felony, forcing him out of office, and was succeeded by Jim Barker. The felony charge of voter tampering was eventually overturned by a federal judge.

See also
Oklahoma Democratic Party

References

External links
Historic members of the Oklahoma House of Representatives

1940 births
2004 deaths
People from Tahlequah, Oklahoma
People from Stillwater, Oklahoma
Oklahoma State University alumni
University of Oklahoma College of Law alumni
Washington University School of Law alumni
Oklahoma lawyers
20th-century American politicians
Speakers of the Oklahoma House of Representatives
Democratic Party members of the Oklahoma House of Representatives
Oklahoma State University faculty